Ronnie C. Matias (born November 29, 1983) is a Filipino professional basketball player for the Sta. Rosa Laguna Lions of the Pilipinas Super League. Matias was drafted 9th overall in the first round of the 2009 PBA draft by the Burger King Titans.

Basketball career

Burger King Titans
Matias was drafted by the Burger King Titans on the 2009 PBA draft, being picked 9th overall at the first round. Matias played two years for Burger King.

Rain or Shine Elasto Painters
Matias was traded to Rain or Shine Elasto Painters from Burger King, which was renamed to Air21,  along with Ronjay Buenafe in exchange for Sol Mercado and Jay-R Reyes, together with the 2011 and 2013 first-round draft picks of Air21. The Express also acquired Reed Juntilla.

Matias won his first title with Rain or Shine after beating the B-Meg Llamados in the finals of the 2012 PBA Governors' Cup.

Air 21 Express
He was traded to Air21 Express in exchange for a future draft pick where Matias played for the Express for four months, and after that, Matias was traded to GlobalPort Batang Pier with Carlo Sharma in exchange for Enrico Villanueva.

GlobalPort Batang Pier
Matias just stayed for a while in this team, he is traded again to the San Mig Super Coffee Mixers in exchange for Yancy de Ocampo and Val Acuña for him and Yousef Taha.

San Mig Super Coffee Mixers
On June 3, 2014, Matias was traded to San Mig Super Coffee Mixers. The trade was a part of a three-team, seven player trade. After Matias was traded to San Mig Coffee, Matias joked that he will bring a dictionary in order to understand the commands of his new coach, Tim Cone, who is an American citizen.

Barako Bull Energy

After winning his second PBA championship, Matias was traded again for Mick Pennisi with his teammate fellow bigman Isaac Holstein. He stayed for Purefoods for only 5 months before being traded to Barako.

Return to Rain or Shine
On 2015, Ronnie Matias was signed up by the Rain or Shine Elasto Painters as a free agent.

PBA career statistics

Correct as of October 18, 2016

Season-by-season averages

|-
| align=left | 
| align=left | Burger King / Air21
| 38 || 19.1 || .455 || .343 || .678 || 3.9 || 1.2 || .4 || .3 || 7.1
|-
| align=left | 
| align=left | Air21
| 13 || 19.4 || .344 || .467 || .531 || 4.7 || 1.8 || .3 || .2 || 6.6
|-
| align=left | 
| align=left | Rain or Shine
| 41 || 13.7 || .432 || .391 || .780 || 3.0 || .8 || .2 || .2 || 5.0
|-
| align=left | 
| align=left | Rain or Shine
| 56 || 14.8 || .408 || .266 || .446 || 3.0 || 1.1 || .3 || .2 || 4.5
|-
| align=left | 
| align=left | San Mig Coffee / Air21 / Rain or Shine / GlobalPort
| 24 || 10.8 || .412 || .133 || .579 || 2.3 || .5 || .2 || .0 || 2.9
|-
| align=left | 
| align=left | Star / Barako Bull
| 9 || 6.9 || .333 || .250 || .444 || 1.8 || .2 || .1 || 0 || 1.7
|-
| align=left | 
| align=left | Rain or Shine
| 13 || 8.8 || .304 || .143 || .667 || 2.2 || .5 || .3 || 0 || 1.9
|-class=sortbottom
| align=center colspan=2 | Career
| 194 || 14.5 || .415 || .295 || .610 || 3.1 || .9 || .3 || .2 || 4.8

Personal life
Matias was born on November 29, 1983 in Tondo, Manila. He also spent most of his childhood there. He is currently living with his partner, Monique and has 6 children. He is a devotee of Black Nazarene.

Controversy
Matias went controversial in 2013, after a commotion that happened on the Smart Araneta Coliseum during a game with Rain or Shine against the Alaska Aces. The police went to the coliseum searching for him with an arrest warrant. Matias said that the case was already five years old and the complaint was made by a certain Arlene Mendoza, accused him for allegedly stealing her wallet. Matias denied the accusations of stealing Mendoza's wallet, and Matias said he was accused because the suspect looked like him. Matias already left the coliseum before the group went. The incident did not happen just once, Matias said that it happened before during a game when he played on the Philippine Basketball League. Matias hired a lawyer after the incident to prove his innocence.

External links
Matias / PBA.ph profile

References

1983 births
Living people
Air21 Express players
Barako Bull Energy players
Filipino men's basketball players
NorthPort Batang Pier players
People from Tondo, Manila
Power forwards (basketball)
Rain or Shine Elasto Painters players
Small forwards
Basketball players from Manila
Magnolia Hotshots players
UM Hawks basketball players
Maharlika Pilipinas Basketball League players
Barako Bull Energy draft picks